Peter Ihnačák (born May 3, 1957) is a Slovak former  professional ice hockey centre. He initially played in the Czechoslovak First Ice Hockey League before defecting during the Cold War and joining the Toronto Maple Leafs of the National Hockey League (NHL). He played eight seasons with the Maple Leafs.

Playing career
A star in Czechoslovakia, Ihnačák was prohibited from playing outside of the Communist bloc because members of his family had already fled the country after the Soviet invasion during the Prague Spring in 1968. He was to play in the 1980 Winter Olympics at Lake Placid, New York but was removed from the team because he was considered a flight risk. During the 1982 IIHF World Championship in Helsinki, Finland, he got on the same plane as then Toronto Maple Leafs general manager Gerry McNamara. On the plane, McNamara was tipped off that Ihnačák intended to defect and the Maple Leafs used their second round selection, 25th overall that they had received in the Darryl Sittler trade to pick him in the 1982 NHL Entry Draft. At the World Championship, Ihnačák defected with the help of his brother John. He was in the opening night lineup of the 1982–83 NHL season, playing on a line with Walt Poddubny and Miroslav Fryčer. In his first year with the Maple Leafs, he amassed a total of 66 points (28 goals and 38 assists), the rookie record within the Maple Leafs organization until it was passed by Auston Matthews in 2017. He went on to play eight seasons with the Toronto Maple Leafs of the National Hockey League (NHL) until 1990.

In Europe, he played with the teams of ŠKP Poprad (Slovakia), HC Dukla Jihlava, HC Sparta Prague (both in the Czech Republic), Freiburg and Krefeld Pinguine (both in Germany).

Post-playing career
He was also the head coach of the team of Nuremberg Ice Tigers (Germany). Ihnačák was a former scout for the Toronto Maple Leafs and later became a European-based scout for the Washington Capitals.

Personal life
Ihnačák's younger brother, Miroslav Ihnačák, was selected by the Maple Leafs in the 1982 NHL Entry Draft. After Ihnačák defected, Miroslav was forbidden to play in international tournaments, for fears he may defect as well. This did not stop him, as he would join his brother and the Maple Leafs in December 1985. Miroslav would play parts of two seasons with the Maple Leafs, and one game with the Detroit Red Wings, before returning to Europe and finishing his career in Slovakia in 2006.

Career statistics

Regular season and playoffs

International

References

External links
 

1957 births
Living people
Czechoslovak defectors
Czechoslovak ice hockey centres
Deutsche Eishockey Liga coaches
EHC Freiburg players
HC Ajoie players
HC Dukla Jihlava players
HC Sparta Praha players
Krefeld Pinguine players
Mad Dogs München players
Newmarket Saints players
Slovak expatriate ice hockey players in Germany
Slovak ice hockey centres
Sportspeople from Poprad
Toronto Maple Leafs draft picks
Toronto Maple Leafs players
Toronto Maple Leafs scouts
Washington Capitals scouts
Czechoslovak expatriate sportspeople in Canada
Czechoslovak expatriate ice hockey people
Czechoslovak expatriate sportspeople in Germany
Czechoslovak expatriate sportspeople in Switzerland
Slovak expatriate ice hockey players in Switzerland
Czech ice hockey coaches